is a Japanese group of companies that manufactures building materials, plumbing fixtures and housing equipment, headquartered in Tokyo.

 is one of the major Lixil companies. Most of Lixil's plumbing fixtures are sold under the brand. Other Lixil companies include American Standard, Permasteelisa, Grohe, etc.

History
The company was formed in 2011 by the merger of Tostem Corp. (a supplier of building materials), INAX (manufacturer of toilets and bathtubs), Shin Nikkei (maker of materials for skyscrapers), Sunwave (a kitchen company) and Toyo Exterior (manufacturer of gates and fences).

In the same year Lixil bought Permasteelisa, an Italian developer of curtain walls, for €575 million. Two years later Lixil bought American Standard Brands, a U.S. bathroom fixtures company for $542 million and in 2014 Grohe, the German bathroom fixtures company for €3.06 billion. It also started manufacturing in Andhra Pradesh, India.

On 6 November 2018, LIXIL announced a new partnership with the Bill & Melinda Gates Foundation to bring what could be the world's first "reinvented toilet" for household use to pilot in at least two markets. This stems from the Reinvent the Toilet Challenge.

Sponsorships
Lixil is the sponsor of the Lixil Cup, awarded from 2014 to 2016 to the champion team from the finals of Japan's Top League, which the nation's highest level rugby union competition.

The company also sponsors tennis player Kei Nishikori, and was a sponsor of the 2020 Olympic Games.

Following their predecessor company Tostem Corp's longstanding shirt sponsorship of the J.League football club, the Kashima Antlers, Lixil has continued this shirt sponsorship since 2011, when the merger with Tostem occurred.

References

External links

Tostem India
Tostem Aluminium Windows
Tostem Aluminium Doors

 
Building materials companies
Bathroom fixture companies
Companies listed on the Tokyo Stock Exchange
Companies listed on the Nagoya Stock Exchange
Manufacturing companies established in 1949
Plumbing materials companies
Japanese brands
Japanese companies established in 1949